Simonides is a crater on Mercury.  Its name was adopted by the International Astronomical Union (IAU) in 1985. The crater is named for Greek lyric poet Simonides.

Simonides has a small, somewhat irregular pit in its center.  Unnamed wrinkle ridges cross the floor of the crater, and one extends to the northwest and southeast.

The crater Ibsen is to the northeast of Simonides, and Neumann is to the southeast.

References

Impact craters on Mercury